The 1980–81 Ole Miss Rebels men's basketball team represented the University of Mississippi in the 1980–81 NCAA Division I men's basketball season. The Rebels were led by fifth-year head coach, Bob Weltlich. The Rebels played their home games at Tad Smith Coliseum in Oxford, Mississippi as members of the Southeastern Conference. This season marked the first NCAA Tournament appearance in school history.

Schedule and results

|-
|-
!colspan=6 style=|Regular season

|-
!colspan=12 style=| SEC tournament

|-
!colspan=12 style=| NCAA tournament

Source:

References 

Ole Miss Rebels men's basketball seasons
Ole Miss
Ole Miss
Ole Miss Rebels men's basketball
Ole Miss Rebels men's basketball